The Kowai River is a river in the Canterbury region of New Zealand. It rises on the southern flanks of the Torlesse Range and travels south, emerging from the foothills of the Southern Alps near Springfield. The river turns east across the upper Canterbury Plains before joining the Waimakariri River.
State Highway 73 follows the river as it climbs towards Porters Pass.

References

Rivers of Canterbury, New Zealand
Waimakariri District
Rivers of New Zealand